The Duncan Mills Bridge was one of nine metal highway bridges in Fulton County, Illinois nominated for the National Register of Historic Places. This particular one was located along west of Havana, Illinois near Lewistown. It was added to the National Register of Historic Places on October 29, 1980, along with the seven of the eight other bridges, as one of the "Metal Highway Bridges of Fulton County". Some of the other bridges include the now demolished Buckeye Bridge and the Tartar's Ferry Bridge, both near Smithfield.

The Duncan Mills Bridge is one of the four bridges submitted under the Fulton County Metal Highway Bridges Multiple Property Submission to have been demolished since its inclusion on the Register.

Notes

Bridges in Fulton County, Illinois
Road bridges in Illinois
Demolished bridges in the United States
National Register of Historic Places in Fulton County, Illinois
Metal bridges in the United States
Parker truss bridges in the United States